Lechmere Warehouse was a railroad stop in Woburn, Massachusetts. It served the Lowell Line of the MBTA Commuter Rail system. The station, located in northwestern Woburn away from the residential areas, primarily served reverse commuters working at the adjacent warehouse of the Lechmere department store. It was a flag stop, with certain northbound stops during the morning rush and southbound trains during the evening rush stopping on request.

History
The station was never heavily used; in 1983, it had just 17 daily riders. The stop was discontinued circa 1997, when the Lechmere stores closed as parent company Montgomery Ward underwent bankruptcy. The platforms are still extant.

References

External links

MBTA Commuter Rail stations in Middlesex County, Massachusetts
Woburn, Massachusetts
Railway stations in the United States opened in 1979
Former MBTA stations in Massachusetts
Railway stations closed in 1997